Two ships of the Royal Navy have borne the name HMS St Anne, after Saint Anne:

  was a ship captured from the French in 1626 and sold in 1630.
  was a 64-gun third rate captured from the French in 1761 and sold in 1784.

Royal Navy ship names